The mixed team 50 meter rifle prone event at the 2019 European Games in Minsk, Belarus took place on 25 June at the Shooting Centre.

Schedule
All times are  local (UTC+3).

Results

Qualification

Semifinal

Final

References

Mixed team 50 metre rifle prone